WCDY (107.9 FM) is a radio station licensed to McBain, Michigan and serving the Cadillac area, broadcasting a Top 40 (CHR) format.

The station was launched on November 6, 2010 with a temporary format of Christmas music.  The permanent format debuted on December 27, 2010.  Over its first 5 years, the station has grown from being an Adult Top 40 (using the slogan "Cadillac's Hits Without The Rap") to a full CHR using the slogan "Cadillac's New Number One".  The station, in an unusual twist for a CHR, still flips to all Christmas just after Thanksgiving each year.

WCDY is owned and operated by Jennifer Theodore, doing business as "Up North Radio, LLC." Theodore is the wife of Dom Theodore, former Vice President of CHR Programming for CBS Radio, including Detroit CHR station WDZH, and former programmer of WDZH's competitor station WKQI.

Sources
WCDY page at Michiguide.com
Interview with Jennifer Theodore from CadillacNews.com, December 2010

External links
 WCDY Official Website

CDY
Contemporary hit radio stations in the United States
Radio stations established in 1980